Multicritical points are special points in the parameter space of thermodynamic or 
other systems with a continuous phase transition. At least two thermodynamic or other 
parameters must be adjusted to reach a multicritical point. At a multicritical point the 
system belongs to a universality class different from the "normal" universality class.  

A more detailed definition requires concepts from the theory of critical phenomena, 
a branch of physics that reached a very satisfying state in the 1970s.

Definition 
The union of all the points of the parameter space for which the system is critical is 
called a critical manifold. 

As an example consider a substance ferromagnetic below a 
transition temperature , and paramagnetic above . The parameter space here is 
the temperature axis, and the critical manifold consists of the point . Now add 
hydrostatic pressure  to the parameter space. Under hydrostatic pressure the substance 
normally still becomes ferromagnetic below a temperature. 

This leads to a 
critical curve in the  plane - a -dimensional critical manifold. Also taking into account
shear stress  as a thermodynamic parameter leads to a critical surface in the 
() parameter space - a -dimensional critical manifold.  
Critical manifolds of dimension  and  may have physically reachable borders of dimension 
 which in turn may have borders of dimension .  The system still is critical at 
these borders. However, criticality terminates for good reason, and the points on the 
borders normally belong to another universality class than the universality class realized 
within the critical manifold. All the points on the border of a critical manifold are 
multicritical points.
Instead of terminating somewhere critical manifolds also may branch or intersect.
The points on the intersections or branch lines also are multicritical points.

At least two parameters must be adjusted to reach a multicritical point.
A -dimensional critical manifold may have two -dimensional borders intersecting at a point. Two parameters must be adjusted to reach such a border, three parameters must be  adjusted to reach the intersection of the two borders. A system of this type represents up to four universality classes: one within the critical manifold, two on the borders and one on the intersection of the borders.

The gas-liquid critical point is not multicritical, because the phase transition at 
the vapour pressure curve is discontinuous and the critical manifold thus consists of a single point.

Examples

Tricritical Point and Multicritical Points of Higher Order
To reach a tricritical point the parameters must be tuned in such a way that the renormalized counterpart of the -term of the Hamiltonian vanishes. A well-known experimental realization is found in the mixture of Helium-3 and Helium-4.

Lifshitz Point 
To reach a Lifshitz point the parameters must be tuned in such a way that the renormalized counterpart of the -term of the Hamiltonian vanishes. Consequently, at the Lifshitz point phases of uniform and modulated order meet the disordered phase. An experimental example is the magnet
MnP. A Lifshitz point is realized in a prototypical way in the ANNNI model. The Lifshitz point has been introduced by R.M. Hornreich, S. Shtrikman and M. Luban in 1975, honoring the research of
Evgeny Lifshitz.

Lifshitz Tricritical Point 
This multicritical point is simultaneously tricritical and Lifshitz. Three parameters must be adjusted to reach
a Lifshitz tricritical point. Such a point has been discussed to occur in non-stoichiometric ferroelectrics.

Renormalization group